Grihajuddha (English language:Crossroads) is a 1982 Bengali film directed and written by Buddhadev Dasgupta and starring Sunil Mukherjee. The film was produced under contract from the  Government of West Bengal. The Naxalite movement in Bengal in the 1970s forms a backdrop to the film.

The film was entered into the main competition at the 39th edition of the Venice Film Festival.

Plot
The Chief labour officer of a private steel company in Barrackpur senses corruption in the management. An idealist he resigns and is murdered. The secretary of the trade union, Probir gets to know of it and is murdered. His comrade Bijan manages to escape and absconds. Nirupama, the sister, who silently cherishes Bijan, along with Sandipan, a reporter, tracks down the hired gang of killers, which include Sital, the goal keeper in a smalltime football team. Sital reveals that they had been lured with the promise of a job. But the promises were not kept and sital wishes to disown his past. Meanwhile, Bijan has made good as a salesman in Nasik and returns to Calcutta as a changed man. His values had been eroded by time and success. He tries to justify his desertion of his earlier convictions, but fails to convince Nirupama. He wants a settled married life with Nirupama. She still clings to the ideals of her dead brother. But confusion and desperation forces Nirupama to accept his proposal. On the date of marriage, Sandipan is found dead in mysterious circumstances. Confused, Nirupama wants to postpone the marriage. Quarrels follow and Nirupama realises that the void between them is too wide to be bridged. The rift, however, forces a helpless girl to the threshold of self awareness. She realises that she, The film ends with Niupama beginning the struggle all by herself.

Cast
Anjan Dutt as Bijon 
Mamata Shankar as  Nirupama 
Goutam Ghose as Sandipan 
Shashanka Bhattacharya   
Manoj Mitra as  Newspaper Editor 
Prabir Guha   
Sunil Mukherjee
Pradip Sen  
Monidipa Roy

Production

Casting
In 1981, Gautam Ghose had done a film with Mamata Shankar called Dakhal. Gautam Ghose said “ While directing Mamata, I would enact some scenes. She called up Buddha and praised my acting skills. In fact, she also to him that he should approach me for the role in ‘Grihajuddha’." Buddha and Mamata reached his residence to convince him to play the part.

Production
Gautam Ghose said about Buddhadeb Dasgupta in an interview " He would always tell the unit that I don't need extra takes since I am myself a cinematographer and know how to walk keeping pace with the trolley. Buddha was trying to develop a new style since the days of ‘Grihajuddha’. We would often get into arguments over why he was doing things a certain way. He would then tell me about wanting to develop a new style. Since I am also a film-maker, I could understand that."

Trivia
1. One of the thugs Shital Das that visited the deceased Prabir Dutta's house was shown to be the goalkeeper of Friends Sporting Club, Kolkata.

References

External links
 

1982 films
Bengali-language Indian films
1982 drama films
Films directed by Buddhadeb Dasgupta
Films set in Kolkata
1980s Bengali-language films
Indian drama films